Dafydd Rhys Jones (born 5 June 1998) is a Welsh footballer who plays as a midfielder for Tredegar Town.

Career
Jones was a product of the Newport County academy. He made his senior debut for Newport in the Football League Cup first round match versus Wolverhampton Wanderers on 11 August 2015 as a second-half substitute. Wolves won the game 2–1. On 31 August 2016, Jones joined Welsh Football League Division One club Monmouth Town on loan until 31 January 2017. In December 2016 Newport County confirmed Jones would be released by Newport at the conclusion of his contract on 31 January 2017.

Following his release, Jones joined Welsh Premier League side Aberystwyth Town. but after 5 appearances he re-joined Monmouth Town on a permanent deal.

References

External links

Sportspeople from Abergavenny
Living people
1998 births
Welsh footballers
Association football midfielders
Newport County A.F.C. players
Monmouth Town F.C. players
Aberystwyth Town F.C. players